Pterolophia mandshurica is a species of beetle in the family Cerambycidae. It was described by Stephan von Breuning in 1938. It feeds on Albizia julibrissin.

References

mandshurica
Beetles described in 1938